Mladen Pralija (born 28 January 1959) is a Croatian former professional footballer who played as a goalkeeper.

Playing career 
Pralija began his career in the Yugoslav First League with HNK Hajduk Split in 1977. He made his club debut on 11 November 1981 against NK Napredak. He also had stints with RNK Split, HNK Šibenik, and NK Čelik Zenica. In 1987, he played abroad in the Bundesliga with Hamburger SV. After the formation of the Croatian First Football League he played with NK Pazinka. He played abroad once more in 1992 in the National Soccer League with Toronto Croatia.

Managerial career
After his retirement from competitive football he made the transition to a football manager. In 1999, he managed the Singapore Armed Forces FC in the S.League. There he achieved the Singapore Cup for the team. In 2018, he was appointed assistant manager under Zoran Vulić for Hajduk Split in the Croatian First Football League. He also worked as Vulić' assistant at Istra, RNK Split, Luch Energiya, Sheriff Tiraspol, Atyrau and Apollon Smyrnis.

References

External links
 

1959 births
Living people
Sportspeople from Šibenik
Association football goalkeepers
Yugoslav footballers
Croatian footballers
HNK Hajduk Split players
RNK Split players
HNK Šibenik players
Hamburger SV players
NK Čelik Zenica players
NK Pazinka players
Toronto Croatia players
Yugoslav First League players
Bundesliga players
Croatian Football League players
Canadian National Soccer League players
Yugoslav expatriate footballers
Expatriate footballers in West Germany
Yugoslav expatriate sportspeople in West Germany
Croatian expatriate footballers
Expatriate soccer players in Canada
Croatian expatriate sportspeople in Canada
Croatian football managers
Association football goalkeeping coaches
Toronto Croatia managers
Warriors FC head coaches
Canadian Soccer League (1998–present) managers
Singapore Premier League head coaches
Croatian expatriate football managers
Expatriate soccer managers in Canada
Expatriate football managers in Singapore
Croatian expatriate sportspeople in Singapore
Croatian expatriate sportspeople in Russia
Croatian expatriate sportspeople in Moldova
Croatian expatriate sportspeople in Greece
Croatian expatriate sportspeople in Kazakhstan
HNK Hajduk Split non-playing staff